Rožaje Municipality (Montenegrin and Bosnian: Opština Rožaje / Општина Рожаје; Albanian: Komuna e Rozhajës) is one of the municipalities of Montenegro. The main centre and capital of the Rožaje municipality is Rožaje. It covers an area of 432 km2, and has a population of 22,964 inhabitants in the 2011 Census. It is located in the geographical region of Sandžak.

Geography and location
The Rožaje municipality is located the mountainous region northeastern region of Montenegro, as it's spread on the banks of the Ibar river, and contains its source. The municipality is located at an altitude of 1000 meters. There are several mountains surrounding the municipality, which are named Beleg, Sijenova, Ahmica, Turjak, Vlahovi, Krsača, Žljeb, and above all of them rises the 2,403m high Hajla. Rožaje is situated on the main road connecting Montenegro with Kosovo. It also has a link with Novi Pazar in Central Serbia. The IB-22 Highway (otherwise known as the Ibarska magistrala) is the main regional road that connects Montenegro with Serbia.

Municipal parliament
The municipal parliament consists of 34 deputies elected directly for a four-year term.

Demographics
The city of Rožaje is the administrative centre of the Rožaje municipality, which has a total of 22,964 residents, and Rožaje itself has a population of 9,567 in 2011. Rožaje is also considered to be the centre for the Bosniak community of Montenegro. Bosniaks form the majority in both the town and the municipality itself. The population of Albanians in Rožaje is 1,158, forming 5% of the total population in 2011. Albeit small, there is a minority of Serbs, mostly located in the village Bijela Crkva, as well as the city. 

Ethnic groups (2011):
 Bosniaks: 19,269 (83.91%)
 Albanians: 1,158 (5.04%)
 ethnic Muslims: 1,044 (4.55%)
 Serbs: 822 (3.58%)
 Montenegrins: 401 (1.75%)
 Other or undecided: 270 (1.18%)

Languages (2011):
 Bosnian: 16,631 (72.42%)
 Montenegrin: 3,967 (17.27%)
 Albanian: 1,055 (4.59%)
 Serbian: 1,026 (4.47%)
 Other or undecided: 285 (1.24%)

Religions (2011):
 Muslims: 21,805 (94.95%)
 Orthodoxy: 1,055 (4.59%)
 Other or undecided: 104 (0.45%)

Gallery

References 

 
Municipalities of Montenegro